Jihad terror attacks by Islamist extremists enacted to further a perceived Islamic religious or political cause occur globally. Some of these plots have been successfully prevented. The culprits used tactics such as arson, vehicle rampage attacks, bomb threats, suicide attacks, bombings, spree shooting, stabbings, hijackings, kidnappings and beheadings. The following is a list of thwarted Islamist terrorist attacks that have received significant press coverage since the Iranian revolution in 1979. See the list of Islamist terrorist attacks for major incidents that successfully resulted in violence.

2000s

2000 
France: 31 December 2000 – A group of Algerian and French-Algerian men planned to attack Strasbourg Cathedral and the nearby Christmas market on New Year's Eve. They were convicted by a court in Frankfurt for a criminal association with a terrorist enterprise which had links to Islamic networks in Britain, Italy and Spain.

2001 
United States: 11 September 2001 – United Airlines Flight 93 crashed down into a field in Stonycreek Township, Pennsylvania after the passengers attempted to regain control of the plane, causing the hijackers to instead fly the plane at in a field in Stonycreek Township, Pennsylvania, near Shanksville, at 10:03a.m.
United States: 22 December 2001 – Richard Reid, also known as the "Shoe Bomber," attempted to ignite explosives in his shoe on board American Airlines Flight 63 from Paris Charles De Gaulle Airport to Miami International Airport. In court, he pleaded guilty to 8 charges of terrorism.

2002 
Germany: April 2002 – In April authorities stopped a cell of the Islamist Al-Tawhid movement in the Ruhr area. The cell planned an attack on Jewish community centres in Berlin and Düsseldorf. In 2003 the Jordanian Shadi A. was sentenced to four years in prison.
Gibraltar: June 2002 – A number of Saudi nationals were sentenced in 2003 by a Moroccan court for attempting to attack warships in Gibraltar in a plot connected to al Qaeda.

2003 
United Kingdom: January 2003 – During the Wood Green ricin plot, a counter-terrorism operation was launched against an al-Qaeda cell planning to use poison for an attack on U.K. streets. An Algerian man was sentenced to 17 years in prison for the plot along with life imprisonment for stabbing a detective to death during his arrest in Manchester.

2004 
Mali: 10 January 2004 – DGSE secret agents foiled a bid by Islamic militants to kidnap contestants in the Paris-Dakar rally as they raced across the Sahara Desert in Sokolo, Mali. Stages 10 and 11 of the annual 2004 Dakar Rally race across the desert in Mali were canceled due to security concerns. The French-backed operation had prevented leading French driver Stephane Peterhansel and Spanish motorcyclist Nani Roma from falling into the Islamists' hands.

2005 
Australia: November 2005 – Five men were arrested on charges of planning a terrorist attack in Sydney in protest of Australia's participation in the Iraq War after securing chemicals and materials for use in the development of an explosive device. The men had been trained by Lashkar-e-Taiba in western Pakistan. They were charged with attempted possession of firearms and extremist material.
Australia: November 2005 – 17 people were arrested in Melbourne and Sydney after it was discovered that they were planning to commit a series of terrorist attacks. These included plans to bomb the 2005 AFL Grand Final, 2006 Australian Grand Prix and the Crown Casino, as well as a plot to assassinate Prime Minister John Howard.

2006 

Canada: 2 June 2006 – During the 2006 Ontario terrorism plot, 18 Al-Qaeda inspired terrorists were arrested by Canadian counter terrorism forces who were accused of planning to detonate truck bombs, open fire in crowded areas, storm the Canadian Parliament building, the Canadian Broadcasting Centre, the headquarters for the Canadian Security Intelligence Service and the Parliamentary Peace tower to take hostages and to behead then Prime Minister Stephen Harper along with other leaders.
Germany: 31 July 2006 – On 31 July 2006, two Improvised Explosive Devices packed in suitcases were placed aboard Deutsche Bahn regional trains in Dortmund and Koblenz. Had the devices functioned as intended, they could have killed around 70 people. The suspects, two Lebanese nationals studying in Germany, were motivated by Jyllands-Posten publication of Muhammad cartoons and they were caught on CCTV cameras. One of the attackers fled to Lebanon after the attack and the other was sentenced to life in prison by the court in Düsseldorf. Europol classified the plot as Islamist terrorism.
United Kingdom: 9 August 2006 – The 2006 transatlantic aircraft plot was a terrorist plot to detonate liquid explosives, carried on board airliners travelling from the United Kingdom to the United States and Canada, disguised as soft drinks. The plot was discovered by British police during an extensive surveillance operation. As a result of the plot, unprecedented security measures were initially put in place at airports. Had the plot been executed successfully, the death toll would've been comparable to the 9/11 attacks.
Denmark: 5 September 2006 – The Vollsmose terrorists were three men convicted of attempted terrorism in Denmark in 2007–2008. Nine men were initially arrested by Danish police in the Vollsmose neighbourhood of Odense on 5 September 2006, but most were later released without charges, including a police mole who played a role in the investigation and trial. Security services found ammonium nitrate, metal splinters and a bottle containing TATP explosives at various locations, including the suspects' houses. Ammonium nitrate is used in fertilizer bombs. The metal splinters, used to cause more damage upon explosion, were brought home by one of the suspects from a metal workshop where he worked. The TATP was destroyed by bomb disposal experts due to the instability of the compound. Personal computers were also confiscated. They contained bomb making instructions downloaded from the internet. Four men were charged with attempted terrorism, three of whom were convicted.
Czech Republic 23 September 2006 – A plot was revealed showing plans for Islamists to kidnap and kill Jews in the Jerusalem Synagogue in Prague by issuing demands that could not feasibly be met and then blowing up the building killing everyone inside.
United States: December 2006 – Derrick Shareef was charged after trying to trade stereo speakers for hand grenades and a handgun as part of a plan to terrorize shoppers at Cherryvale Mall in Rockford, Illinois during the holiday season.

2007 
United Kingdom: 31 January 2007 – In February 2008 Parviz Khan, a man with extreme Islamist views and links with the Taliban, was jailed for life along with four other members of the terrorist cell. The plot involved kidnapping and beheading a Muslim soldier of the British Armed Forces with the help of drug dealers in Birmingham.
Denmark: 4 September 2007 – Two men were sentenced to twelve and seven years in prison, respectively, for planning a terrorist attack in Glostrup. The court said that the men had been in contact with al-Qaeda and that one of them had been at a training camp in Waziristan.

2008 
Spain: 18 January 2008 – In October 2009, ten Pakistanis and one Indian, a group adhering to extremist Islamist ideology, were convicted by the Audiencia Nacional for possessing explosives and belonging to a terrorist group. Having connections to al-Qaeda and the Taliban, they had intended to plant explosives on the Barcelona Metro as the first of a series of attacks.
Italy: December 2008 – Rachid Ilhami and Albdelkader Ghafir, two Moroccan citizens, were arrested in Giussano, on the charge of planning attacks in their home town. The two men had planned three attacks in areas nearby Giussano: in the Esselunga Supermarket in Seregno, in the big parking close to the supermarket and at the local police station.

2009 
Australia: August 2009 – Four men connected to al-Shabaab were arrested in August 2009 after it was discovered that they were planning to infiltrate the Holsworthy Barracks in Sydney with automatic weapons.
United States: 8 September 2009 – Eight men affiliated with Al Qaeda were arrested for a plot to bomb the New York City subway system and other international targets. Police allege that they were transporting explosives and just mere days from executing their plot. Some were sentenced in November 2015 to over 40 years in prison.
United States: 25 December 2009 – Umar Farouk Abdulmutallab, aka the "Underwear Bomber," failed in an attempt to activate a high powered explosive sewn into his trousers while on board Northwest Airlines Flight 253 en route from Amsterdam Airport Schiphol to Detroit Metropolitan Airport on Christmas,.  There were 289 total crew members and passengers on board. The U.S. Federal court sentenced him to four consecutive life sentences plus 50 years.

2010s

2010 
United States: 26 March 2010 – Raja Lahrasib Khan was arrested by the FBI in Chicago while attempting to board a flight to London with a large amount of cash intended to fund an Harkat-ul-Jihad al-Islami plot to plant bombs at an unnamed American sports arena.
Azerbaijan: 28 March 2010 – Authorities in Azerbaijan detained eight people, including a Chechen man on suspicion of planning terrorist acts against a school and kindergarten in Baku. The group had earlier concealed weapons and ammunition in the roof of a kindergarten and a school in Baku, and planned to attack both.
United States: 1 May 2010 – Faisal Shahzad ignited a bomb in Times Square in New York City, but it failed to detonate. He was later arrested while on a flight bound for Dubai.
France, Germany, United Kingdom: 28 September 2010 – The 2010 European terror plot was an alleged al-Qaeda plot to launch "commando-style" terror attacks on the United Kingdom, France, and Germany. The existence of the plot was revealed in late September 2010 after it was disrupted by intelligence agencies.
United States: 29 October 2010 – During the Cargo planes bomb plot, two plastic explosive bombs were discovered on two cargo planes addressed for two synagogues in Chicago. The discovery was made at East Midlands Airport and Dubai International Airport while en route.
United States: 25 November 2010 – During the 2010 Portland car bomb plot, Mohamed Osman Mohamud attempted to detonate a car bomb at a Christmas tree lighting ceremony.
United Kingdom: December 2010 – Mohammed Chowdhury, Shah Rahman, Gurukanth Desai and Abdul Miah, inspired by al-Qaeda, were arrested in December 2010 for plotting to place a bomb in the London Stock Exchange. The men also planned sending letter bombs and conducting a Mumbai-style attack. In the trial, the four and a further five, all of Pakistani and Bangladeshi origin, were described as Islamist fundamentalists.

2011 
Denmark: 2 January 2011 – Swedish and Danish authorities arrested four suspected militant Islamic jihadists for allegedly planning a terrorist attack against the Jyllands-Posten news bureau in Copenhagen. In 2006, the newspaper became the target of terrorist threats after it printed controversial cartoons concerning the Prophet Muhammad in 2005. Authorities claimed that the suspects planned to use the same swarm tactics as in the 2008 Mumbai killing spree.
Nigeria: 19 March 2011 – Outside a church in Jos, Nigeria, two attackers from Boko Haram were killed when their bomb prematurely exploded outside the ECWA Church, Nasarawa Gwom in Jos, Nigeria.
United States: 26 May 2011 – Two Iraqi immigrants were arrested for sending money and weapons to Iraq while living in Bowling Green, Kentucky. They were also found to be plotting to kill American soldiers on their return.

2012 
Indonesia: 2 March 2012 – An Indonesian court sentenced an Islamist for plotting an Easter church attack and several attempted parcel bombings.  He had plotted to set off a massive bomb beneath a gas pipeline near a church in Serpong outside Jakarta in 2011, but the police foiled the attack after finding the device. He was sentenced to 18 years in jail.
Indonesia: 21 March 2012 – Police shot 5 suspected Islamic militants who were plotting to attack and bomb targets in Bali, including a bar popular with tourists.  Five men were shot dead in police raids on Sunday on the island where nightclub bombings in 2002 killed 202 people.
Azerbaijan: May 2012 – Azerbaijan claimed that it arrested 40 people suspected of having plotted a terrorist attack on the previous week's Eurovision Song Contest in Baku. The Azeri National Security Ministry states that the plotters had planned to attack the event's venue, the Baku Crystal Hall, and several hotels on the eve of the competition.

2013 
Israel: 1 January 2013 – A plot to kidnap an Israeli civilian or soldier for use as a bargaining chip was foiled when Israel's General Security Service detained and arrested an Islamic Jihad terrorist group comprising an Israeli Arab citizen and two Palestinians at the Eyal checkpoint. Kidnapping paraphernalia such as rope and tape, as well as a knife and an imitation handgun, were found in their possession, and they confessed to multiple previous failed kidnapping attempts.
Canada: 22 April 2013 – Two people were arrested after being involved in an alleged Islamist plot to derail a New York to Toronto train on the Canadian side of the border. Though the plot was not imminent, Canadian Muslims helped to foil the plot.
Russia: 19 May 2013 – Russia's counter-terrorism division of the Federal Security Service claimed that its special forces killed two militants and detained a third, believed to have been planning a terrorist act in Moscow. They were holed up in the Moscow suburb of Orekhovo-Zuevo, and police ordered them to surrender, but instead the militants opened fire. The militants were Russian citizens who had received training along the Afghanistan-Pakistan border.

2014 
Switzerland: March 2014 – Swiss authorities charged four Iraqi nationals for planning a terrorist attack in Europe on behalf of the Islamic State. Though details of the planned attack were sketchy, Switzerland's attorney general confirmed on Friday that IS "was to claim responsibility (for) these plans if successful".
United States: 16 March 2014 – A California National Guardsman was captured Monday after an FBI investigation revealed a foiled plot to attack the Los Angeles Subway and plans to help al-Qaeda, officials said.  Ased Abdur-Raheem was a recent convert to Islam.
Norway: July 2014 – The Norwegian Police Security Service said on 24 July 2014 that there was an imminent threat of an attack by people linked to Islamists in Syria. Security measures were introduced for a week until the threat was deemed reduced.
Pakistan: 6 September 2014 – AQIS claimed responsibility for an attack on Karachi Naval Dockyard, reportedly carried out by former Pakistan Navy officers, who unsuccessfully tried to hijack the PNS Zulfiquar (F251). Three attackers were killed and seven were arrested by Pakistani forces.
Australia: 18 September 2014 – In response to an alleged plot to behead a random individual of the public, large scale terror raids were conducted in Sydney and Brisbane that resulted in numerous arrests from 25 homes.
Peru: 29 October 2014 – Peru foiled Hezbollah terror attack on Israelis. In a search of the terrorist's hideout apartment, police found weapons and explosives which were intended to be used against Jews.

2015 
Philippines: 18 January 2015 – The FBI and Philippine special forces killed Zulkifli bin Hir after he launched a plot to bomb the large Pope's mass in Rizal Park, which attracted a crowd of six million Christians. Hir was the leader of Jemaah Islamiyah, a south-east Asian militant Islamist terrorist organization.
Malaysia: 6 April 2015 – 17 people were arrested for allegedly planning to commit a terrorist attack in Malaysia's capital city, Kuala Lumpur.
Australia: 18 April 2015 – Five teenagers, were arrested during counter-terror raids in Sydney, were allegedly planning an Islamic State-inspired attack during the ANZAC Day commemorations.
United States: 3 May 2015 – Curtis Culwell Center attack – Two gunmen, armed with assault rifles and declaring allegiance to Islamic State, attempted to storm a "Draw Mohammed" cartoon event sponsored by the American Freedom Defense Initiative in Garland, Texas featuring the far-right Member of the Dutch House of Representatives Geert Wilders. The attackers were shot dead at the entrance by armed guards. One guard was slightly wounded; otherwise, this attack was thwarted and no major violence inflicted.
United Kingdom: 28 May 2015 – British couple arrested just days short of launching a major attack to celebrate the 10th anniversary of the London 7/7 bombings with intent to bomb a major mall or subway. Substantial quantities of chemicals and bomb-making wherewithal was found in their possession.
France: 21 August 2015 – 2015 Thalys train attack
United States and Australia: September 2015 – Jewish American Internet troll Joshua Ryne Goldberg was arrested, and later convicted, of planning the bombing of a 9/11 memorial event in Kansas City while posing as an Australian ISIS supporter. In December, a 17-year-old Greenvale, Melbourne teenager, who had been in contact with Goldberg, pleaded guilty to preparing a terror attack, after bombs were found in his home. Goldberg's ISIS persona also attempted to incite mass shootings in Australia. Goldberg also took credit for the Curtis Culwell Center attack earlier in the year, after posting maps to the event, and his online ISIS persona being re-tweeted by one of the attackers on the morning of the attack.
Italy: October 2015 – security police in Italy dismantled a terrorist cell in Trento. Its spiritual leader was Mullah Krekar who was later extradited from Norway. Following appeal, Rahim Karim Twana and Hamasalih Wahab Awat were each sentenced to nine years in prison. Abdul Rahman Rahim Zana, Jalal Fatah Kamil and Hamad Bakr were sentenced to seven and a half years each in prison. Krekar was sentenced to 12 years in prison.
France: 2 November 2015 – A Frenchman, after failing twice to travel to Syria to join ISIS, is arrested and charged for running a terror plot to attack French Navy personnel at Toulon military port.
Spain: 3 November 2015 – Spanish police arrested 3 Moroccans with strong ties to ISIS in Ceuta who were set to execute a "Charlie Hebdo" style attack in the Spanish capital of Madrid at La Canada Real and Vallecas.
France: 13 November 2015 – A series of terrorist attacks in Paris kill 137, and wound 368. Portions of the master attack were successfully thwarted. Security at the football stadium turned away one bomber with a suicide vest at the gate who had planned to go inside and trigger a mass panic rush towards his accomplices. Only one bystander died in this instance. Reports from both police and friends indicated that another accomplice, Salah Abdeslam, was supposed to launch an additional suicide bomber attack in the 18th arrondissement, but he fled without attacking anyone.
Canada: 14 November 2015 – Canadian police shoot suspected suicide bomber after a standoff unfolded between police officers in the Mississauga neighborhood of Peel near Toronto.  Bomb squad and heavily armed tactical teams deployed.
Germany: 17 November 2015 – A football friendly between Germany and the Netherlands and labelled a "symbol of freedom" in the aftermath of the Paris attacks was cancelled and the spectators evacuated shortly before the match, due to a bomb threat. A German newspaper later claimed that a French intelligence dossier, detailing plans to carry out five bombings, had prompted the Germans to order the evacuation.
Germany: 26 November 2015 – German special forces unit arrested two men in a Berlin raid. They were accused of plotting "a significant criminal act against state security," according to Berlin authorities. The two men were arrested in the Britz section of the German capital after a search was conducted on an Islamic cultural center, police said.
Turkey: 15 December 2015 – Turkish police have detained a Syrian Islamic State militant suspected of planning a suicide attack against the U.S. Consulate in Istanbul.  The U.S. Consulate was closed down the prior week due to this threat.
Italy: 15 December 2015 – A Palestinian and a Tunisian national were arrested after they tried to disarm soldiers stationed outside the historic Basilica di Santa Maria Maggiore in Rome while yelling "Allah (God) is great".
Australia: 22 December 2015 – The Australian Federal Police arrest two individuals plotting to attack the naval base  at Woolloomooloo.
France: 22 December 2015 – Police arrest two men for plotting terror attacks in Orléans, France. They were plotting to kill police and French Army personnel in the central French city.
Germany: 31 December 2015 – The Munich Police Department claims it thwarted attack plots involving between five and seven suicide bombers on the München Hauptbahnhof and Pasing railway stations in Munich after receiving tips from American and French intelligence sources.

2016 
Denmark: January 2016 – A 17-year-old girl planned to attack a school in Fårevejle Stationsby and a private Jewish school in Copenhagen, the attack was scheduled to take place in early 2016, using home-made bombs. In May 2017, she was tried and found guilty in the district court (Danish: byret) of Holbæk and was sentenced to six years in jail. She appealed the verdict and was tried by the Østre Landsret which found her guilty of planning to carry out terrorism with jihadist motive.
United States: 25 January 2016 – 23-year-old Samy Mohamed Hamzeh was arrested after attempting to purchase automatic weapons from undercover FBI and Joint Terrorism Task Force agents. The man planned an attack on a Masonic temple in Milwaukee in the name of "defending Islam". Acting U.S. Attorney, Gregory Haanstad, said that it was a "detailed plan to commit a mass shooting intended to kill dozens of people."  Hamzeh said, "Such operations will increase in America, when they hear about it. The people will be scared and the operations will increase, and there will be problems all over,... this will lead to people clashing with each other. This way we will be igniting it. I mean we are marching at the front of the war."
Sweden: February 2016 – Aydin Sevigin was convicted of plotting to carry out an ISIS-inspired suicide bombing on Swedish soil using a homemade pressure-cooker bomb.
Germany: 4 February 2016 – German police arrest four who were planning major Islamic State attack in Berlin. Police arrested four Algerians suspected of links to the Islamic State group after raids targeting several sites, including refugee shelters where some of the suspects lived.
Jordan: 2 March 2016 – Jordanian security services thwarted a plot by Islamic State militants to blow up civilian and military targets. They located the militants, who were carrying suicide belts, in a hideout at a Palestinian refugee camp near the Syrian border in Irbid.
Somalia: 7 March  2016 – US fixed wing and drone aircraft bombard a training camp for al-Shabaab, a major terrorists group in Somalia. The camp had been under surveillance for several week and intelligences agencies believed that a major attack on African Union Mission to Somalia peacekeepers was imminent. Over 150 militants were killed.
Turkey: 7 March 2016 – Turkish forces detains IS suspects; seizes explosives and suicide vest. Two militants were seized at a border crossing on the Turkey-Syria border.
France: 11 March 2016 – The Paris Police Prefecture arrest four teen girls for planning copycat Paris style concert hall attack. They posted messages on Facebook that specifically named their intended target and planned to get funding and weapons from known Jihadist activist sites in Belgium.
United Kingdom: 1 April 2016 – Delivery driver, Junead Khan, was convicted in an English Crown Court for plotting to kill American and British soldiers in England by staging road accidents on behalf of Islamic State in Bedfordshire, Norfolk, and Cambridgeshire. Kingston upon Thames Crown Court, located in the southwest of London, heard that Junead Khan had been visited four times by police trying to divert him from extremism but he had rejected their offers of help.
France: 23 March 2016 – Police in France arrest Reda Kriket. DGSI went on to charge Kriket, who had already been convicted in Belgium for terrorist offenses, for planning an imminent terrorism attack in advanced stages along with three others, was detained in Belgium and the Netherlands.
United Kingdom: 26 March 2016 – A man was arrested on 26 March 2016 by MI5 when a handgun, a pipe bomb and a cleaver inscribed with the word "kafir" (English: unbeliever) was found in his car. His neighbour in the Sparkhill area was arrested as were two others. A sword was found in one of the men's car. Two of them had previously been arrested and jailed in 2013 for going to an al-Qaeda training camp in Pakistan. All four were convicted of preparation of an act of terrorism in August 2017.
Russia: 12 April 2016 – Three militants, including at least one suicide bomber, were killed in a failed attempt to attack a police station in Russia's Stavropol region. No police officers or civilians were harmed and witnesses report hearing five explosions and lots of gunfire. This police station follows a fortress defense pattern to withstand possible ISIS attacks that have occurred before in this area.
Afghanistan: 21 April 2016 – 10 Islamic militants were killed while they were busy making an improvised explosive device (IED) inside a mosque in southeastern Ghazni province.
Denmark: 22 April 2016 – A US Soldier is decorated for foiling an active terrorist plot to blow up a school in Denmark while stationed at Al Asad Airbase in Iraq's Al Anbar Governorate during the American military intervention against ISIL. The soldier uncovered evidence of the plot and his communications to authorities in Denmark resulted in arrests and the confiscation of explosives.
Italy: 28 April 2016 – Italian authorities arrested four people suspected of extremism and issued arrest warrants for two more operating in Syria, according to the Milan prosecutor. The suspects are believed to have been planning to attack the Israeli Embassy in Rome and the Vatican City.
Russia: 30 April 2016 – Illegal Muslim prayer hall blown up in Russia after police find Islamist explosives cache inside. The video of the controlled explosion shows a considerable part of the building being destroyed in the blast in an illegal Muslim prayer hall near the Russian city of Samara.
Italy: 10 May 2016 – Italian police have arrested two men accused of planning terror attacks in the UK and Italy. The suspects are alleged to have been plotting strikes on targets in London, including restaurants, hotels and a pedestrian footbridge near Canary Wharf in the east of the capital. Rome's Colosseum and Circus Maximus, the ancient chariot racing stadium and a venue for modern-day concerts, are also said to have featured on their list.
Singapore: June 1, 2016 – Four men plead guilt in Singapore court to plotting to overthrow their home country of Bangladesh for the Islamic State.
Germany: 2 June 2016 – Düsseldorf terror attack thwarted as German police arrest three men from Syria plotting attack for Islamic State. The organization's leadership ordered the two to carry out an attack in the bustling central pedestrian zone of Düsseldorf, the prosecutor's office said.
Indonesia: 16 June 2016 – Indonesian bomb maker sentenced to five years prison time for plotting to bomb a Java Island Buddhist temple. Three other helpers receive lesser sentences. Thwarted plot was inspired by Islamic State extremists.
Belgium: 18 June 2016 – Belgian authorities arrest three men plotting a terror attack on a party gathered to watch a football match between Belgium and Ireland.
Saudi Arabia: 4 July 2016 – On the last day of Ramadan, militants attempt 3 attacks inside this country, but the first two at Jeddah and Qatif appears to be successfully thwarted with only the attackers coming to harm.
South Africa: 11 July 2016 – South African authorities arrested 4 ISIS supporters for plotting to bomb the US Embassy in Pretoria and an unidentified Jewish target. A large stockpile of grenade and other combat materials were seized.
United States: 20 July 2016 – A Tucson man is charged in federal court on terrorism charges for plotting to bomb a State Motor Vehicle office and Jewish Community Center in a plot thwarted by the FBI. He had been emailing contacts with the Taliban to show support for Jihad and to get instructions on bomb-making.
United Kingdom: August 2016 – Terrorist cell from the West Midlands called "Three Musketeers" arrested. In August 2017, Naweed Ali, 29, Khobaib Hussain, 25, Mohibur Rahman, 33, and Tahir Aziz, 38 were all convicted of planning a bomb and knife attack against a police or military target in the UK.
Singapore: 5 August 2016 – Police in Indonesia arrest six militants linked to ISIS operative in Syria who were planning a major rocket attack in neighboring Singapore.
Canada: 10 August 2016 – Getting intelligence of an impending martyrdom operation, Royal Mounted Police shot and killed a man who set off an explosive device during his arrest. He was previously known to local authorities for his allegiance and support for Islamic State and had been given a court order prohibiting all contact with them.
Italy: 13 August 2016 – The Italian government arrested and deported a Tunisian national tied to the Islamic State and suspected of planning a bombing of the Leaning Tower of Pisa.
Germany: 13 September 2016 – German security forces arrest three Syrian refugees in Schleswig Holstein. This was one of two terrorist cells sent to Europe by the Islamic State in 2015. The other carried out the November 2015 Paris attacks. In March 2018, the Hanseatischer Oberlandesgericht in Hamburg sentenced them to prison.
Germany: 8 October 2016 – 2016 Chemnitz terrorism plot
Kuwait: 9 October 2016 – US Troops save the life of their attacker, pulling him from his burning vehicle after he deliberately rammed their vehicle in a failed jihad attack.
Germany: 10 October 2016 – German police in Leipzig declare that they narrowly thwarted a major Islamic State terror attack targeting a major Berlin airport or rail-hub.  They arrested a Syrian migrant who had 3 pounds of explosive in his possession. 3 days later, the prime suspect committed suicide in jail.
Spain: 11 October 2016 – Spanish police have arrested two men on the suspicion of seeking recruits for the Islamic State group, the interior ministry said on Tuesday. The two men, who were arrested in separate operations in northern Spain, were both "fully integrated" into the infrastructure of the jihadist group and were "encouraging terrorist acts," the statement said.
United States: 11 October 2016 – An 18-year-old Tucson-area man accused of planning jihad-style attacks in Maricopa and Pima counties pleaded guilty to three felonies and faced up to 14 years in prison, the Arizona Attorney General's Office announced.
Australia: 12 October 2016 – Counter-terrorism police arrested two 16-year-old boys over an incident in Sydney's south-west.
Iran: 13 October 2016 – Iran's security forces thwarted terror plots in southern province of Fars.
Turkey: 19 October 2016 – Turkish police killed a suspected Islamic State militant group (ISIS) suicide bomber in Ankara, ahead of a planned attack, according to officials and state media.
Kosovo, Macedonia, and Albania: 17 November 2016 – Planned simultaneous attacks were thwarted in Albania, Kosovo, and Macedonia. 18 people were arrested.
United States: 21 November 2016 – A Brooklyn man, Mohammed Rafik Naji, 37, a legal US resident originally from Yemen, was arrested by the New York City Police Department and charged with preparing a "Nice style terror attack".
France: 23 November 2016 – Six people arrested in France for plotting a terror plot for December 1. Plot targeted Disneyland Paris, Champs-Elysées, police say. They were preparing an attack in the Paris area were directed from the ISIS heartland.
Germany: 26 November 2016 – A 12-year-old German-Iraqi boy was directed by a 19-year-old ISIL supporter to build nail bombs. One bomb was planted at the local Christmas market on 26 November and another near a shopping centre on 5 December; both failed to detonate. The 19-year-old along with a 15-year-old girl to whom he was married according to Islamic law also planned an attack against USAF Ramstein Air Base. The 19-year-old was declared guilty of membership in a terrorist organisation and directing a terrorist attack and sentenced to 9 years in prison by a court in Vienna.
Netherlands: 26 November 2016 – Police arrest suspects associated with the Arrayan Mosque in northern Amsterdam plotting to blow up a nearby synagogue, according to a report by the Dutch daily, De Telegraaf.
Germany: December 2016 – A man who arrived in 2011 from Dagestan and a close acquaintance of the 2016 Berlin truck attack, Tunisian Anis Amri, planned an attack against a target in Berlin using explosives. The court found that he supported radical Islamism and was found guilty of preparing a terrorist attack.
Australia: 22 December 2016 – Police raids in Melbourne's northern suburbs foil alleged Christmas Day mass terror attack targeting Federation Square, St. Paul's Cathedral, and Flinders Street Station.

2017 
Malaysia: 7 March 2017 – Malaysian authorities arrested 7 militants in a plot to assassinate King Salman and other members of the Saudi Arabian royal family. The militants were officially being held under charges of "for suspected links to militant groups including Islamic State," a known jihadist terror organization.
Italy: 30 March 2017 – Italian police arrested 4 militants plotting to blow up the historic Rialto Bridge in Venice in a plot supporting ISIS.
France: 18:March 2017 – French police arrested 2 men in the city of Marseille seizing weapons and home made explosives. The intended target was not announced, but police claimed that an attack was imminent. The accused were allegedly caught with arms and an ISIS flag, by an ISIS allegiance video intercept.
Norway: 8 April 2017 – In the aftermath of the 2017 Stockholm truck attack, a man was arrested and part of the Grønland district of Oslo closed off by police after a "bomb-like" device was found. The device was later demolished in a controlled explosion. The man, a 17-year-old Russian citizen, was charged on 9 April with illegal possession of an explosive device. The man arrived in Norway as an asylum seeker in 2010, and was known to the Norwegian Police Security Service (PST) for having expressed support for the Islamic State of Iraq and the Levant.
Germany: 10 April 2017 – A man arrested in a police raid near Leipzig was suspected of plotting an attack in Berlin.
United Kingdom: 27 April 2017 - British police arrested a 27-year-old man on a terrorism watch list in the Whitehall neighborhood of London. He was carrying 2 large knives. The man's family had tipped off the police.
United Kingdom: July 2017 – A 17-year-old boy was arrested in July 2017. He pleaded guilty to disseminating violent Islamic State propaganda prior to the trial. On his mobile phone, police found chat conversations where he discussed stabbing attacks and suicide attacks. In March 2019 he was convicted of planning a terror attack.
Australia: 29 July 2017 – Australian authorities prevented a plot to bring down an airplane over the city of Sydney. Four suspects were arrested and security warnings heightened at airports. Additional reports said that the plot was stopped at the airport luggage check-in counter when a traveler attempted to check a bag that was too heavy. One suspect was released, but three were detained and more property searches were carried out.
Germany: 31 October 2017 – German police arrested a 19-year-old Syrian whom they suspected was planning an Islamist-motivated bomb attack.
Australia: 28 November 2017 – An Islamic State sympathiser planned to buy a gun and kill as many revelers as possible on New Year's Eve in Melbourne, police alleged, after foiling the plot.
United Kingdom: 6 November 2017 – One man, Naa'imur Zakariyah Rahman was arrested by the Metropolitan Police Service for plotting to assassinate Prime Minister Theresa May. Police believed the plotter planned to detonate an IED at the prime minister's offices.
Russia: 12 December 2017 – Moscow police arrest three alleged members of an ISIS cell they said were preparing a holiday suicide bomb, gun, and grenade attack.
Russia: 15 December 2017 – The Russian Federal Security Service (FSB) detained suspected members of a terrorist cell linked to Islamic State. A series of bombings was planned in St. Petersburg, with the iconic Kazan Cathedral among the targets.
United Kingdom: 19 December 2017 – Four men were arrested on suspicion of plotting an Islamist terror attack as armed police carried out a series of dramatic pre-dawn raids in Sheffield and Chesterfield.
Germany: 20 December 2017 – German police arrested a man accused of planning a vehicle-based terrorist attack in the southwestern city of Karlsruhe. The suspect had alleged connections to the Islamic State group.
United States: 22 December 2017 – A U.S. Marine Corps veteran's alleged plan for a holiday attack on Pier 39 in San Francisco was foiled. The suspect, Everitt Aaron Jameson, was inspired by the Islamic State.

2018 
Italy: 26 April 2018 – Italian police thwart a car-ramming attack in Naples after a Gambian man was arrested. He reportedly pledged allegiance to the leader of the Islamic State.
Sweden: 30 April 2018 – On 30 April 2018, 46-year-old man who had arrived as a refugee from Uzbekistan was arrested when police searched and found explosives on his property. In March 2019 he was sentenced to 7 years in prison for planning a terrorist attack in Sweden in the name of the Islamic State and financing serious crime. He was also given a deportation order and a ban from returning to Sweden again. Four other men were sentenced for falsifying documents or financing serious crime and received prison sentences ranging from 1 to 6 months in prison.
Germany: 13 June 2018 – Sief Allah H. was arrested from Cologne, as he was manufacturing an explosive device which incorporated the highly toxic substance called ricin.
France: 14 June 2018 – French police thwart attack by "radicalized convert to Islam" planned against Paris club.  An improvised explosive device was found at his home in Seine-et-Marne and the man admitted that he wanted to use it to target a swingers’ club.
Netherlands: 19 June 2018 – Dutch Police forces arrest three men in Rotterdam, Schinnen and Groningen suspected of planning a terrorism act.
Netherlands: June 2018 – Two Moroccan-Dutch men were arrested in Rotterdam for plotting a jihadist attack. The investigators found a video of the Erasmus Bridge in one of their cell phones. In October 2020, they were sentenced to eight years in prison by a court in Rotterdam for planning an attack in the name of the Islamic State. One of the men was also convicted for destroying property in the prison while encouraged by the jihadist Mohamed B, who killed Theo van Gogh in a terrorist attack.
France: 30 June 2018 – French government publicly accuses the "Islamic Republic of Iran" of plotting a major bomb attack targeting a large conference of an Iranian exile group that met on 30 June in Paris.  France seizes assets of two diplomats, German police arrest one diplomat to extradite to Belgium to face terrorism charges there related to this incident. Iran denies all charges
Netherlands: 27 Sept 2018 – Dutch police grab seven terror suspects as they foil major attack with suicide vests, assault rifles and car bombs.  Suspects were rounded up in flash raids by heavily armed police in Arnhem and Weert, following a months long investigation of their group leader was an ardent supporter of ISIS.
Denmark: 30 Oct 2018 – Denmark publicly accuses the "Islamic Republic of Iran" of preparing a political assassination on their soil. This incident triggered a major nationwide manhunt for the hit squad including closures of key international bridges to Sweden. Denmark recalls their ambassador from Iran to protest against Iranian terrorism activity on their soil.

2019 
India: January 2019 – Members of an "IS-inspired" terror group were arrested by Anti-Terrorism Squad from the Indian State of Maharashtra for allegedly planning mass killing (by poisoning the prasad) at Mumbreshwar Temple, these men were inspired by speeches of controversial Islamic preacher Zakir Naik.
Germany: 23 March 2019 – Police arrest 10 people in Hesse and Rhineland-Palatinate, the 3 main protagonists wished 'to kill as many non-believers as possible.''
United States: April 2019 – The FBI arrested a 26-year-old former U.S. Army infantryman from Los Angeles who expressed his support for ISIS. His intentions were to attack Jews, churches and police officers to avenge the deaths of Muslims killed in New Zealand during the Christchurch mosque shootings.
United States: 8 April 2019 – Maryland man accused of plotting to run van into National Harbor crowd, 'keep driving and driving and driving' as inspired by the Islamic State terror network.
Russia: 12 April 2019 – Major gun battle erupts in the Siberian city of Tyumen when Russian security forces attempt to detain two extremists plotting an attack for the Islamic State terror network.
Sri Lanka: 21 April 2019 – 2019 Sri Lanka Easter bombings of several church and hotels resulting in 290+ deaths and 500+ injuries. Authorities report additional attacks were thwarted with the neutralization of additional devices near the main airport and Dr. Neville Fernando Hospital. Health Minister, Rajitha Senaratne, confirmed that all of the bombers were Sri Lankan citizens associated with National Thowheed Jama'ath (NTJ), a local militant radical Islamist group, but foreign links are suspected.
Lebanon: 4 June 2019 – Four security member of police and army of Lebanon killed by a former member of ISIS. 
United States: 6 June 2019 – The FBI and NYPD arrested a 22-year-old resident of Queens after purchasing two Glock pistols from an undercover government agent. He described his desire to obtain grenades and a suicide vest to stage an attack in either Washington or New York to target a senior government official.
India: June 2019 – Five Hizbul Mujahideen terrorists were arrested by the Indian Army in the Indian state Jammu and Kashmir. During interrogation, these terrorists revealed that they were planning a massive attack on Indian security forces using a sophisticated IED.
India: June 2019 – A major terror attack was averted because of a timely action taken by the Special Task Force of Kolkata Police. Promptly acting on a tip-off, the STF on Tuesday arrested four Jamaat-ul-Mujahideen Bangladesh militants from Howrah and Sealdah.
United Kingdom: 3 July 2019 – Mohiussunnath Chowdhury, who was released from prison in December 2018 following his involvement in the Buckingham Palace attack a year earlier, was arrested after planning a series of attacks after his release. He discussed potential targets such as a gay pride parade, Madame Tussauds and a London tour bus.
India: July 2019 – The NIA detained 16 men who were planning terror attacks, through knives, vehicles and poison. 14 of these men where deported from UAE, while two were arrested in India. These men had established a terror module based on the varied ideologies of Al Qaeda, Islamic State and Students Islamic Movement of India.
 Israel: 06-August 2019 – The Israel Defense Forces, the Israel Police, and the Shin Bet arrest three members of a Hamas bomb team to thwart a major plot targeting Jerusalem.
Sweden: 14 August 2019 – A man was arrested in central Östersund after the police received an alert about a driver who "drove strange" at Stortorget. The suspect is a 32-year-old man from a small town in northern Jämtland. When police arrived at the scene, a car chase was starting before the suspect drove into a concrete foundation. He was suspected of carrying out a terrorist attack by his vehicle.
France: 26 September 2019 – One man was arrested after French intelligence services thwart a terror plot inspired by the 9/11 attack. The suspect was looking for a weapon to hijack a plane.
Netherlands: 26 November 2019 – Dutch Police arrest two individuals, 20 and 34, in the city of Zoetermeer after they were tipped off that the duo were planning a jihadist attack with explosive belts and car bombs. Police found a throwing ax, a dagger, a mobile phone and several SIM cards in their apartment.
United Kingdom: October 2019 – Safiyya Amira Shaikh was arrested for plotting to bomb St Paul's Cathedral in the city of London during Easter celebrations in 2020. She had also planned to bomb a nearby hotel in London and then blow herself up in a suicide attack on the London Underground.
Poland: 4 December 2019 – A Ukrainian man who recently converted to Islam was detained by authorities after planning to detonate a car bomb.
Denmark: 11 December 2019 – Twenty suspected Islamists were arrested on suspicion of planning a terror attack. Some materials for bomb making were found in the raids that followed.
United Kingdom: 30 December 2019 – Four men were arrested on suspicion of preparing an act of terrorism in England, whilst a fifth man was arrested for promoting terrorism. A number of addresses was raided by counterterrorism police in London, Peterborough and Manchester. The arrests were not linked to the 2019 London Bridge Stabbing which happened a few days earlier.

2020s

2020 
 France: 22 January 2020 – French police arrest seven for Islamist extremist-linked terror plot in the western coastal city of Brest and the surrounding Finistere region.  Some of the men were on the country's “Fiche S” list of potential security risks because of their links with Islamic extremists.
Germany: 15 April 2020 – Four suspects from ISIS were arrested in Germany for allegedly planning to attack U.S. Air Force bases.
Denmark: 30 April 2020 – One man was arrested after planning a terrorist attack which is said to have “a militant Islamic motive”. The suspect, who had been working alone, allegedly tried to obtain firearms and ammunition. Copenhagen police did not provide details on the location of the attack but did say that the man was planning “one of several attacks”.
Spain: 8 May 2020 – The FBI and Spanish police arrested a Moroccan man after foiling a suspected terror plot to attack Barcelona. Police say the suspect had been radicalised and had links to ISIS for at least four years, but kept a low profile until recently.
United States: 27 May 2020 – The United States Department of Justice announced the filing of a criminal complaint against Muhammed Momtaz Al-Azhari. He was accused of trying to provide material support or resources to the Islamic State of Iraq and al-Sham (ISIS). He was most likely planning an attack in the Tampa area including Honeymoon Island State Park. Al-Azhari attempted to purchase multiple guns over the course of the investigation and acquired a Glock pistol and a silencer.
United States: 26 September 2020 – Two men face charges over an alleged plot to create "Netflix-worthy" attacks (bombings or shootings) on high-profile targets including the White House and Trump Tower in New York City. The men also discussed plans to travel to Syria and fight for the Islamic State.
Netherlands: 8 October 2020 – Six men are jailed for up to 17 years for planning a major terrorist attack on a large event in the Netherlands and for setting up a terrorist organisation. Photos showing four of the group of suspected terrorists trying on bomb vests and waving Kalashnikov rifles while living in a house on a holiday park in Limburg were shown. Iraqi national Hardi N was jailed for 17 years. Three others – Nabil B, Morat M and Wail el A – were jailed for 13. The remaining two, Shevan A and Nadim S, were jailed for 10.
Belgium: 31 October 2020 – Two underage people were arrested for planning a suspected terror attack. The two minors had recorded a video pledging the allegiance to Islamic State and were suspected of planning a stabbing attack against police officers.
Russia: 25 November 2020 –One person was detained by security services and a home-made bomb was seized. Russia's Federal Security Service said that it had thwarted attacks planned by Islamic State in the Moscow region. A cell was also uncovered and broken up.
United States: 16 December 2020 – A Kenyan national and Al-Shabaab member who received pilot training in the Philippines planned to recreate a 9/11 style terrorist attack by hijacking a commercial aircraft and crashing it into an unnamed building. Cholo Abdi Abdullah was charged on six counts on terrorism-related offenses. He also allegedly researched how to gain access into a cockpit along with the tallest building in the United States and how to obtain an American Visa.
Russia: 26 December 2020 – The Kremlin's security service says it thwarted a plot to carry out an attack in the country's southern republic of Dagestan. The FSB found "weapons, a large amount of ammunition and an explosive device."

2021 
Denmark and Germany: 12 February 2021 – 14 people were arrested by German and Danish authorities on suspicion of planning an Islamist-motivated bomb attack. The suspects acquired ingredients used to manufacture explosives along with firearms. An Islamic State flag was also found in the raids that followed. While it was unclear as to where the attack would take place, it was emphasized by authorities that the threat of Islamist terrorism remains high in Denmark and Germany.
Algeria: 3 March 2021 – An explosive device found in Algiers was deactivated after three members of a terrorist group were arrested.
Syria: 15 March 2021 – Security forces killed three people and arrested three more after foiling an attack, which involved the use of explosive belts, on Damascus.
Sweden: 1 April 2021 – Swedish security police arrested an Afghan couple in Stockholm which prevented a terrorist attack.
Russia: 22 April 2021 – The FSB detained a supporter of the Islamic state terrorist organisation who plotted to carry out an attack in Norilsk during a parade on Victory Day. Explosive substances and strike elements were found at his home.
Russia: 9 July 2021 – Security forces detained an ISIS fighter, which developed a plan to arrange a terrorist attack in Moscow oblast.
Netherlands: 23 September 2021 – Dutch police arrested a gang of nine men in Eindhoven suspected of planning a terrorist attack. The men discussed the possibility of targeting Prime Minister Mark Rutte, PVV leader Geert Wilders, FvD leader Thierry Baudet and Health Minister Hugo de Jonge.

See also 
 List of Islamist terrorist attacks
List of unsuccessful terrorist plots in the United States post-9/11
 Captain Harith al-Sudani—Iraqi intelligence officer infiltrated into ISIS car-bomb cell, thwarted about 30 attacks.

References

External links
 timelineofterrorism.com
 "A History of Terror..." (prior to September 11)
 Terrorist attacks and related incidents in the United States

Islam-related lists
Islamic terrorism
Terrorism-related lists
Terrorist incidents by perpetrator
War on terror
Islamic